Goran Nikolić (Serbian Cyrillic: Горан Николић; born on July 1, 1976) is a Montenegrin former professional basketball player. He is 2.07 m (6 ft 9 ½ in) in height and 111 kg (245 lbs) in weight.

Born in Nikšić, Montenegro, then Yugoslavia, he is a power forward-center. Nikolić has been a member of the Serbia-Montenegro national basketball team and he played at the 2006 FIBA World Championship.

External links
Basket-stats.info Profile
Eurobasket.com Profile
Euroleague.net Profile
TBLStat.net Profile

1976 births
Living people
2006 FIBA World Championship players
AEL Limassol B.C. players
Alba Berlin players
Anadolu Efes S.K. players
BC Kyiv players
CB Estudiantes players
Centers (basketball)
KK FMP (1991–2011) players
KK Sutjeska players
Liga ACB players
Mersin Büyükşehir Belediyesi S.K. players
Montenegrin expatriate basketball people in Serbia
Montenegrin expatriate sportspeople in Ukraine
Montenegrin men's basketball players
Panionios B.C. players
Power forwards (basketball)